Bed is a short story collection by Tao Lin, published in 2007. It was published simultaneously with his first novel, Eeeee Eee Eeee. The two books were his first books of prose.

Table of Contents

1. LOVE IS A THING ON SALE FOR MORE MONEY THAN THERE EXISTS
2. THREE-DAY CRUISE
3. SUBURBAN TEENAGE WASTELAND BLUES
4. SINCERITY
5. LOVE IS THE INDIFFERENT GOD OF THE RELIGION IN WHICH UNIVERSE IS CHURCH
6. CULL THE STEEL HEART, MELT THE ICE ONE, LOVE THE WEAK THING; SAY NOTHING OF CONSOLATION, BUT IRRELEVANCE, DISASTER, AND NONEXISTENCE; HAVE NO HOPE OR HATE—NOTHING; RUIN YOURSELF EXCLUSIVELY, COMPLETELY, AND WHENEVER POSSIBLE
7. NINE, TEN
8. INSOMNIA FOR A BETTER TOMORROW
9. SASQUATCH

Background

Stories in Bed first appeared in Mississippi Review, Cincinnati Review, Portland Review, Other Voices, among other magazines. The first story was the winner of One Story's annual story contest.

Reception
Bed received few but mostly positive reviews. Time Out Chicago said of it: "Employing Raymond Carver’s poker face and Lydia Davis’s bleak analytical mind, Lin renders ordinary—but tortured—landscapes of failed connections among families and lovers that will be familiar to anyone who has been unhappy." KGB Lit Journal said of it: "This is the territory of the young—college students, graduate students, recent graduates—and the stories are mainly concerned with the characters' romantic relationships. In structure and tone, they have the feel of early Lorrie Moore and Deborah Eisenberg. Like Moore's characters, there are a lot of plays on language and within each story, a return to the same images or ideas—or jokes. And like Moore, most of these characters live in New York, are unemployed or recently employed, and are originally from somewhere more provincial (Florida in Lin's case, Wisconsin in Moore's). However, Lin knows to dig a little deeper into his characters—something we see in Moore's later stories, but less so in her early ones.

External links
Site featuring three stories from Bed

References

2010 short story collections
American short story collections
Works by Tao Lin